Mathew John Bailey (born 12 March 1986) is an English footballer who plays for Leek Town. When playing for Crewe Alexandra, he played at centre back or up front.

Career

Stockport County
As a youth, Bailey started his career at non-League club Nantwich Town scoring on his debut at Atherton Collieries in August 2002. He impressed Stockport County of the Football League enough to earn a trial for The Hatters. Whilst on trial, he impressed manager Carlton Palmer who offered Bailey a three-year contract, which Bailey duly signed. Under new manager Sammy McIlroy, Bailey impressed in the reserves and was sent out on a one-month loan to League Two club Scunthorpe United at the start of the 2004–2005 season, making his début against Rochdale, a 3–1 defeat for Scunthorpe. He played in four first-team matches whilst at Glanford Park without scoring. He returned to Stockport in October 2004 and his début under McIlroy in the 2–0 defeat against Wrexham in the Football League Trophy. McIlroy was sacked in late November and was replaced by Chris Turner. Bailey made his league début under Turner in the League One game against Chesterfield as an 89th minute substitute, replacing Mark Robertson. Bailey was sent out on loan to Conference National outfit Northwich Victoria for a month, making his début at Carlisle United, a 1–0 defeat for Northwich. He played in five first-team matches for Carlisle without scoring. He was released by Stockport in May 2005.

Crewe Alexandra
Whilst on loan at Northwich Victoria, Bailey trained with Championship club Crewe Alexandra and scored twice in an under-18 game for The Railwaymen. This performance impressed manager Dario Gradi enough to earn him a one-year contract in May 2005. During the 2005–06 season, Bailey went out on loan to non-league clubs Hereford United, Southport and Lancaster City to gain first-team experience, but despite not breaking into the first team during the season and Crewe's relegation to League One, he was offered a one-year contract extension. In the 2006–07 season, Bailey found himself in a similar situation to the previous season, failing to break into the first team and being sent out on loan, to Barrow of the Conference North, for whom he appeared in ten matches. He was offered another one-year extension to his contract. Bailey made his Alexandra début on 1 September 2007 in a 1–1 draw at Swindon Town, replacing Tom Pope in the 82nd minute.

Change of position

Bailey did not impress manager Dario Gradi as a striker. Gradi, who had trained the likes of David Platt and Dean Ashton in their early years, announced his intention to convert Bailey from a striker to a centre back. Gradi did not expect Bailey to push through and challenge as a first team centre back until the start of 2008. Bailey made his full debut for Alexandra away at Oldham Athletic in the second round of the FA Cup, where he played at centre back. Bailey went on loan to Weymouth for a month in March 2008; he made four appearances without scoring. When he returned to Crewe, Bailey did not feature in the team and he was released in May 2008; he played only times for Crewe.

Later career
Bailey rejoined Northwich Victoria in May 2008. He was loaned to Hinckley United in December 2008, scoring on his debut for the Conference North club. He joined AFC Telford United in August 2013. Shortly afterwards, he was sent on loan to Nantwich Town.

References

External links

1986 births
Living people
Sportspeople from Crewe
English footballers
Association football defenders
Association football forwards
Stockport County F.C. players
Scunthorpe United F.C. players
Northwich Victoria F.C. players
Crewe Alexandra F.C. players
Hereford United F.C. players
Southport F.C. players
Lancaster City F.C. players
Barrow A.F.C. players
Hinckley United F.C. players
AFC Telford United players
English Football League players
National League (English football) players
Northern Premier League players
Weymouth F.C. players
Eastwood Town F.C. players
Nantwich Town F.C. players